Wave Motion is a peer-reviewed scientific journal publishing papers on the physics of waves – with emphasis on the areas of acoustics, optics, geophysics, seismology, electromagnetic theory, solid and fluid mechanics. Original research articles on analytical, numerical and experimental aspects of wave motion are covered.

The journal was established in 1979 by editor in chief Jan D. Achenbach. In 2011, Andrew N. Norris joined as co-editor in chief, and became sole editor in chief in 2012. The role of editor in chief passed to William J. Parnell in 2017 and K.W. Chow became deputy editor in chief at this time. The journal is published by Elsevier.

Abstracting and indexing 
The journal is abstracted and indexed in Applied Mechanics Reviews, Current Contents/Engineering, Computing & Technology, Current Contents/Physics, Chemical, & Earth Sciences, Compendex, Inspec, Mathematical Reviews, Scopus, and Zentralblatt MATH. According to the Journal Citation Reports, Wave Motion has a 2016 5 year impact factor of 1.704 and an impact factor of 1.575, ranking it 15th out of 31 journals in the category "acoustics", 71st out of 133 in the category "mechanics", and 32nd out of 79 in the category "physics, multidisciplinary".

See also
 List of periodicals published by Elsevier

References 

Physics journals
Waves
Publications established in 1979
Elsevier academic journals
English-language journals